Alexander Fraser may refer to:

Lords Saltoun
Alexander Fraser, 11th Lord Saltoun (1604–1693), Scottish peer
Alexander Fraser, 13th Lord Saltoun (1684–1748)
Alexander Fraser, 14th Lord Saltoun (1710–1751)
Alexander Fraser, 16th Lord Saltoun (1758–1793)
Alexander Fraser, 17th Lord Saltoun (1785–1853), Scottish peer and British Army general
Alexander Fraser, 18th Lord Saltoun (1820–1886)
Alexander Fraser, 19th Lord Saltoun (1851–1933), Scottish peer
Alexander Fraser, 20th Lord Saltoun (1886–1979), Scottish peer

Others
Alexander Fraser of Touchfraser and Cowie (died by 1332)
Alexander Mackenzie Fraser (1756–1809), British general
Alexander Fraser (Upper Canada politician) (1786–1853), soldier and political figure in Upper Canada and Canada West
Alexander George Fraser (1786–1865), Scottish painter
Alexander Fraser (painter) (1827–1899), Scottish landscape painter and son of Alexander George Fraser
Alexander Fraser (Victorian politician) (1802–1888), member of the Victorian Legislative Council 1858–1881
Alexander Campbell Fraser (1819–1914), Scottish philosopher
Alexander Fraser (Ontario politician) (1824–1883), member of the 1st Parliament of Ontario
Alexander Fraser (British Army officer, born 1824) (1824–1898), General, Royal Engineer who served in Burma
Alexander Fraser (Australian politician) (1892–1965), senator in the Australian Parliament, later a Victorian Legislative Assembly member
Alexander E. Fraser (1843–1905), merchant and political figure in Nova Scotia, Canada
Alexander Cumming Fraser (1845–1944), politician in Manitoba, Canada
Alexander G. Fraser (born c. 1937), American computer scientist
Alexander V. Fraser (1804–1868), 1st Captain-Commandant of the US Revenue Marine
Alexander Fraser, 4th Lord Lovat (1527–1557), Scottish peer
Alexander Fraser (archivist) (1860–1936), Canadian historian
Alexander Fraser (Royal Navy officer) (1747–1829), Royal Navy officer who rose to the rank of vice-admiral

See also
Alex Fraser (disambiguation)
Alec Fraser (disambiguation)
Fraser (surname)
Alexander Fraizer (1610–1681), Scottish physician
Alexander Fraser Campbell, George Cross recipient
Fraser (disambiguation)